Women's Super G World Cup 1991/1992

Final point standings

In Women's Super G World Cup 1991/92 all results count.

External links
 

World Cup
FIS Alpine Ski World Cup women's Super-G discipline titles